The rusty catshark (Halaelurus sellus) is a species of catshark in the genus Halaelurus. It is a tropical catshark found around the waters off Australia, in the eastern Indian Ocean. It was named by W.T. White, P.R. Last, and J.D. Stevens in 2007. Male Halaelurus sellus can reach a maximum length of 35.3 centimetres, while females can reach a maximum length of 42.3 centimetres.

References

rusty catshark
Marine fish of Western Australia
rusty catshark